Manchester 62 Football Club Women is an amateur association football club in Gibraltar, currently playing in the Gibraltar Women's Football League. The club is affiliated to Manchester 62.

History
The earliest known record of Manchester 62's women's team is in the 1999 season of the Gibraltar Women's Football League, with the league seemingly abandoned with the Red Devils, top of the league. After a 6 year absence, the team returned in 2005, remaining involved in the league for 11 years before folding during the 2016–17 season.

On the eve of the 2021–22 Gibraltar Women's Football League season, it was revealed that Manchester 62 would return to senior football after 5 years. Fielding a young side built from the club's youth teams, they lost on their return 9-0 against another new entry to the league, Gibraltar Wave.

Honours
Gibraltar Women's Football League
Winners: 2005, 2006, 2007–08, 2015–16
Runners-up: 2007, 2010–11, 2012–13, 2013–14, 2014–15
Women's Rock Cup
Winners: 2013, 2014, 2015

Current squad

References

2021 establishments in Gibraltar
Women's football clubs in Gibraltar